Phractura stiassny is a species of catfish in the genus Phractura. It has a length of 11.5 cm. It is only known from a single specimen from the Nyanga River in Gabon.

References 

stiassny
Freshwater fish of Africa
Fish described in 2007